Cosmoclostis schouteni is a moth of the family Pterophoridae. It is known from Ivory Coast.

References

Endemic fauna of Ivory Coast
Pterophorini
Insects of West Africa
Moths of Africa
Moths described in 1990